Chambord can refer to:

 Chambord (liqueur), a brand of raspberry-flavored liqueur
 Château de Chambord, a French château built in the 16th century
 Chambord, Loir-et-Cher, the French commune where the château is located
 Chambord, Eure, a commune in the Eure département of France
 Chambord, Quebec, in Canada
 Henri, Count of Chambord, a pretender to the French crown from the House of Bourbon
 Simca Vedette Chambord, a French car
 Simca Chambord (Brazilian model), a Brazilian-made car, from a subsidiary of the French company Simca
 Chambord, a line of French press coffee makers made by Bodum